A professor is a senior teacher, lecturer and researcher, usually in a college or university.

Professor may also refer to:

Entertainment

Fictional characters 
 The Professor (Gilligan's Island), a character in the 1960s TV series
 The Professor, a McDonaldland character 
 The Professor, a nickname for the Seventh Doctor in the TV series Doctor Who
 The Professor (Money Heist), a character in the Netflix series
 Professor, an anthropomorphic mole character from the Spyro video game series
 Professor, a character from the Ape Escape video game series
 Professor, a character in the 1979 Soviet film Stalker

Literature 
 The Professor (novel), by Charlotte Brontë, 1857
 The Professor, a 1938 novel by Rex Warner

Film, television and theatre 
 Professor (1962 film), an Indian Hindi musical
 Professor (1972 film), an Indian Malayalam-language film
 The Professor (1919 film), an uncompleted silent comedy by Charlie Chaplin
 The Professor (1986 film) or Il camorrista, an Italian film based on the life of crime boss Raffaele Cutolo
 The Professor (2018 film), an American comedy-drama
 La prima notte di quiete, released in France as Le professeura, a 1972 French-Italian film
 "The Professor" (My Name Is Earl), a television episode
 Professor, the puppeteer of Punch and Judy shows

People

Stage name
 Prof (rapper) (born 1984), American rapper
 Professor (musician) (born 1978), South African Kwaito musician

Nicknamed "The Professor"
 Roy Bittan (born 1949), American keyboardist in the E Street Band
 Grayson Boucher (born 1984), American street basketball player
 Raffaele Cutolo ("Il professore") (born 1941), Italian crime boss
 Mohammad Hafeez (born 1980), Pakistani cricketer
 Jan Janssen (born 1940), Dutch professional cyclist
 Lefter Küçükandonyadis ("Ordinaryüs") (1925–2012), Turkish footballer
 Igor Larionov (born 1960), Russian ice hockey player
 Howard Lederer (born 1964), American professional poker player
 Greg Maddux (born 1966), American baseball pitcher
 Neil Peart (1952–2020), Canadian drummer for Rush
 Alain Prost (born 1955), French Formula One racing driver
 Mike Tenay (born 1954), American professional wrestling play-by-play announcer
 Dai Vernon (1894–1992), Canadian sleight of hand magician
 Alan Turing (1912–1954), nicknamed "Prof", English mathematician and computer scientist
 Prof: Alan Turing Decoded, a 2015 biography of Turing

See also
 Professor T. (British TV series)
 Professor Griff (born 1960), American rapper in the group Public Enemy
 Professor Longhair (1918–1980), American New Orleans blues pianist
 Casey Stengel ("The Old Perfesser") (1890–1975), American baseball player and manager

Lists of people by nickname